Kidangoor is a small village in Thuravoor Panchayath near Angamaly in Eranakulam district in the Indian state of Kerala.

Kidangoor consists of vast agricultural area near Angamaly town, in Thuravoor Panchayath. It is divided into South Kidangoor and North Kidangoor. Angamaly to Manjapra - Malayaattoor road is the main road passed through this area. This area is under Thuravoor Grama panchayath, Angamaly Village, Aluva taluk, Ernakulam District. Mullassery canal is a main water stream going through the village. Kidangoor is the birthplace of V T Bhattathirippad.

Schools
 Sree Bhadra LP School
 Infant Jesus LP School
 St. Joseph's Higher Secondary School
 Alphons Sadhan Special School 
 Auxilium School Kidangoor

Notable personalities
V. T. Bhattathiripad- Indian social critic, well-known dramatist and a prominent freedom fighter. Lived in kidangoor -Birthplace of his mother
 Cardinal Joseph Parecattil - He served as Archbishop of Ernakulam from 1956 to 1984, and was elevated to the cardinalate in 1969.
 Chemban Vinod Jose - Famous Malayalam movie artist.

Temples
 Kulappurakavu Bhagavathi Temple,a renowned temple in the area.
 Kidangoor Sree Mahavishnu Temple
 Kavalakkattu Mahadeva Temple
 Vilangappurath Sree Bhadrakali Temple
 Sree Subramanya Swami Temple
 Kovattu Bhagavathi Temple
 Sree malikappuram Temple
 Vettakorumakan Temple

Church
Infant Jesus Church Kidangoor.
St: Jude Shrine Yoodhapuram.
St:Sebastain Church North Kidangoor.

Residents associations
 Nethaji Nagar Residents Association [NRA]
 Kidangoor Residents Association [KRA]
 Shanthi Ngaar Residents Association
 Gandhi nagar Residents Association
 Haritha nagar Residents Association
 Green Feeld Residents Association
Kidangoor South Residents Association (KSRA)

Clubs
Presidency Club 
Sree Muruka Arts and Sports Club

Gallery

References 

Villages in Ernakulam district